St. John's Episcopal Church is a historic Episcopal church located at Honeoye Falls in Monroe County, New York.  It is a one-story, stone structure built in 1841–1842, with a bell tower added in 1855.  The building features Greek Revival massing and a Doric order portico with Gothic Revival arched windows and doorways.

It was listed on the National Register of Historic Places in 1988.

References

Churches on the National Register of Historic Places in New York (state)
Episcopal church buildings in New York (state)
Gothic Revival church buildings in New York (state)
Churches completed in 1841
19th-century Episcopal church buildings
Churches in Monroe County, New York
National Register of Historic Places in Monroe County, New York
Churches completed in 1842